FC Gvardeyets Skvortsovo is an association football team based in Skvortsovo, 
Crimea.

Team names
Source:
 1945–1954: FC Gvardeyets Gvardeyskoye 
 1954–2014: FC Hvardiyets Hvardiiske
 2014–2020: FC Gvardeyets Gvardeyskoye
 2020–present: FC Gvardeyets Skvortsovo

Honours

All-Crimean Championship (unofficial 1st Tier)
  2015
Crimean Premier League (1st Tier)
  2020–21 
CFU Cup (National Cup)
  2020–21
  2018–19

League and cup history

Ukraine
{|class="wikitable"
|-bgcolor="#efefef"
! Season
! Div.
! Pos.
! Pl.
! W
! D
! L
! GS
! GA
! P
!Domestic Cup
!colspan=2|Europe
!Notes
|- align=center bgcolor=SteelBlue
|align=center|2010
|align=center|5th Crimean Championship
|align=center bgcolor=silver|2/12
|align=center|22
|align=center|17
|align=center|2
|align=center|3
|align=center|60
|align=center|17
|align=center|53
|align=center|
|align=center|
|align=center|
|align=center|
|- bgcolor=SteelBlue
|align=center|2011
|align=center|5th Crimean Championship
|align=center bgcolor=gold|1/13
|align=center|22
|align=center|16
|align=center|4
|align=center|2
|align=center|75
|align=center|21
|align=center|52
|align=center|
|align=center|
|align=center|
|align=center|
|- bgcolor=SteelBlue
|align=center|2012
|align=center|5th Crimean Championship
|align=center bgcolor=gold|1/12
|align=center|22
|align=center|18
|align=center|1
|align=center|3
|align=center|85
|align=center|15
|align=center|51
|align=center|
|align=center|
|align=center|
|align=center|
|- bgcolor=SteelBlue
|align=center|2013
|align=center|5th Crimean Championship
|align=center bgcolor=gold|1/11
|align=center|18
|align=center|17
|align=center|0
|align=center|1
|align=center|73
|align=center|14
|align=center|51
|align=center|
|align=center|
|align=center|
|align=center|
|- bgcolor=SteelBlue
|align=center|2014
|align=center|5th Crimean Championship
|align=center bgcolor=gold|1/16
|align=center|24
|align=center|21
|align=center|1
|align=center|2
|align=center|99
|align=center|12
|align=center|64
|align=center|
|align=center|
|align=center|
|align=center bgcolor=brick|Reorganization of competitions
|-
|}

Crimea
{|class="wikitable"
|-bgcolor="#efefef"
! Season
! Div.
! Pos.
! Pl.
! W
! D
! L
! GS
! GA
! P
!Domestic Cup
!colspan=2|Europe
!Notes
|-
|align=center|2015
|align=center|1st All-Crimean Championship Gr. B
|align=center bgcolor=gold|1/10
|align=center|9
|align=center|7
|align=center|1
|align=center|1
|align=center|32
|align=center|8
|align=center|22
|align=center|
|align=center|
|align=center|
|align=center bgcolor=silver|Final (defeat); reorganization of competitions
|- bgcolor=LightCyan
|align=center|2015–16
|align=center|2nd Open Championship
|align=center bgcolor=silver|2/16
|align=center|24
|align=center|18
|align=center|4
|align=center|2
|align=center|76
|align=center|12
|align=center|58
|align=center|
|align=center|
|align=center|
|align=center|1st–2nd league match (defeat)
|- bgcolor=LightCyan
|align=center|2016–17
|align=center|2nd Open Championship
|align=center bgcolor=gold|1/13
|align=center|23
|align=center|21
|align=center|2
|align=center|0
|align=center|70
|align=center|11
|align=center|65
|align=center| finals
|align=center|
|align=center|
|align=center|Refusal of promotion
|- bgcolor=LightCyan
|align=center|2017–18
|align=center|2nd Open Championship
|align=center bgcolor=silver|2/13
|align=center|24
|align=center|21
|align=center|1
|align=center|2
|align=center|60
|align=center|21
|align=center|59
|align=center| finals
|align=center|
|align=center|
|align=center bgcolor=lightgreen|Promoted
|-
|align=center|2018–19
|align=center|1st Premier League
|align=center|8/8
|align=center|28
|align=center|5
|align=center|6
|align=center|17
|align=center|23
|align=center|47
|align=center|21
|align=center bgcolor=silver|Runners-up
|align=center|
|align=center|
|align=center bgcolor=pink|Relegated
|- bgcolor=LightCyan
|align=center|2019–20
|align=center|2nd Open Championship
|align=center bgcolor=gold|1/12
|align=center|22
|align=center|19
|align=center|3
|align=center|0
|align=center|82
|align=center|10
|align=center|60
|align=center| finals
|align=center|
|align=center|
|align=center bgcolor=lightgreen|Promoted
|-
|align=center|2020–21
|align=center|1st Premier League
|align=center bgcolor=silver|2/8
|align=center|28
|align=center|14
|align=center|5
|align=center|9
|align=center|47
|align=center|36
|align=center|47
|align=center bgcolor=gold|Winner
|align=center|
|align=center|
|align=center|
|-
|align=center|2021–22
|align=center|1st Premier League
|align=center|
|align=center|
|align=center|
|align=center|
|align=center|
|align=center|
|align=center|
|align=center|
|align=center|
|align=center|
|align=center|
|align=center|
|-
|}

References

External links
Gvardeyets Skvortsovo on CrimeanSport.ru 

 
Football clubs in Crimea
Association football clubs established in 1945
1945 establishments in the Soviet Union
Sports team relocations